SS Diamond State (T-ACS-7) is a crane ship in the NDRF for the United States Navy.  The ship was named for the state of Delaware, which is also known as the Diamond State.

History 
Diamond State was laid down on 22 November 1960, as the break-bulk freighter SS Japan Mail, ON 287976, IMO 5170185, a Maritime Administration type (C4-S-1s) hull, under MARAD contract (MA 87). Built by Todd Shipyards, Los Angeles Division, San Pedro, Los Angeles, California, hull no. 78, she was launched on 8 August 1961 and delivered to MARAD on 19 April 1962, entering service for American Mail Line, a subsidiary of American President Lines. In 1971 she was lengthened and converted to a type (C6-S-1a) hull container ship by Bethlehem Steel, San Francisco, CA. On 14 November 1975, the ship was renamed SS President Truman, after AML was merged into APL. She was returned to MARAD 21 January 1987, and placed in the National Defense Reserve Fleet (NDRF). In 1988 the ship was converted to a type  (C6-S-1aq) Crane Ship, completed 15 December 1988, and assigned to the Ready Reserve Force, (RRF), under operation control of Military Sealift Command (MSC) and placed in service as SS Diamond State (ACS-7), 22 February 1989. Diamond State is one of 10 Crane Ships in the Surge Force and was berthed at Houston, TX. and assigned to Maritime Prepositioning Ship Squadron Three and was maintained in a five-day readiness status (ROS 5).  She was removed from MSC control, withdrawn from the RRF by reassignment to the NDRF (Beaumont, TX) on 28 July 2006.

References

Notes

Bibliography

Online 
 SS Diamond State (T-ACS-7)

External links 
 National Defense Reserve Fleet Inventory

 

Ships built in Los Angeles
1961 ships
Keystone State-class crane ships